David Vaughn III (born March 23, 1973) is an American retired professional basketball player.

Born in Tulsa, Oklahoma, Vaughn attended Whites Creek High School in Tennessee, and was a USA Today All-USA First-Team selection. He was later drafted out of Memphis State University by the Orlando Magic in the first round (25th overall) of the 1995 NBA draft. A  forward, Vaughn played four seasons in the National Basketball Association (NBA) from 1995 to 1999. He played for the Magic, Golden State Warriors, Chicago Bulls and New Jersey Nets.

In his NBA career, Vaughn played in 118 games and scored a total of 341 points.

After leaving the NBA, he played in Europe, then returned to Orlando. Having saved little money from his NBA playing days, he worked a number of blue-collar jobs, and for a time in 2008 was living out of his car. In 2009, his friends held a fundraiser for him. "I bought houses that were too big and too many luxurious cars. I wish I'd have lived more simply because I'd be better off. [...] I appreciate people stepping forward. It'll help me put some of my life back together," he said in an interview.

As of September 2009, Vaughn was supporting his wife and their two children in southwest Orlando, Florida.

References

External links

1973 births
Living people
African-American basketball players
American expatriate basketball people in Greece
American expatriate basketball people in Spain
Basketball players from Oklahoma
Centers (basketball)
Chicago Bulls players
Golden State Warriors players
Greek Basket League players
Liga ACB players
McDonald's High School All-Americans
Memphis Tigers men's basketball players
Near East B.C. players
New Jersey Nets players
Orlando Magic draft picks
Orlando Magic players
Parade High School All-Americans (boys' basketball)
Power forwards (basketball)
Sportspeople from Tulsa, Oklahoma
American men's basketball players
21st-century African-American sportspeople
20th-century African-American sportspeople